Jõgeva Parish is a rural municipality of Estonia, in Jõgeva County. It has a population of 13,513 (2018) and an area of 458 km² (177 mi²).

Populated places
Towns
Jõgeva (administrative center)

Small boroughs
Kuremaa - Laiuse - Palamuse - Sadala - Siimusti - Torma

Villages
Alavere - Änkküla - Eerikvere - Ehavere - Ellakvere - Endla - Härjanurme - Imukvere - Iravere - Järvepera - Jõune - Kaarepere - Kaave - Kaera - Kaiavere - Kantküla - Kärde - Kassinurme - Kassivere - Kaude - Kivijärve - Kivimäe - Kodismaa - Koimula - Kõnnu - Kõola - Kudina - Kurista - Laiusevälja - Leedi - Lemuvere - Liikatku - Liivoja - Lilastvere - Lõpe - Luua - Mooritsa - Mullavere - Mõisamaa - Nava - Näduvere - Ookatku - Oti - Õuna - Paduvere - Painküla - Pakaste - Palupere - Patjala - Pedja - Pikkjärve - Pööra - Praaklima - Rääbise - Raadivere - Raaduvere - Rahivere - Rassiku - Reastvere - Rohe - Ronivere - Saduküla - Sätsuvere - Selli - Soomevere - Sudiste - Süvalepa - Tealama - Tähkvere - Teilma - Tõikvere - Tooma - Toovere - Tuimõisa - Vägeva - Vaiatu - Vaidavere - Vaimastvere - Väljaotsa - Vana-Jõgeva - Vanamõisa - Vanavälja - Varbevere - Vilina - Viruvere - Visusti - Võduvere - Võidivere - Võikvere

Religion

See also
Laiuse Castle
Endla Nature Reserve
Lake Endla

References

External links